Millinocket is a town in Penobscot County, Maine, United States. The population was 4,114 at the 2020 census.

Millinocket's economy has historically been centered on forest products and recreation, but the paper company closed in 2008.

History
Millinocket was first settled in 1829 by Betsy and Thomas Fowler and their family, who cleared land for a farm. When the Bangor and Aroostook Railroad extended service to Houlton in 1894, the line ran through the area, opening it to development.

Charles W. Mullen, an engineering graduate from the University of Maine, proposed a hydroelectric dam on the Penobscot River. He recognized the falls as an ideal water power source to operate a large pulp and paper mill. Mullen contacted Garret Schenck, vice-president of the International Paper mill at Rumford Falls and an expert in the industry, about building a pulp and paper mill near the dam. Mr. Schenck agreed, and set about obtaining the necessary financial backing.

After securing land rights, the chosen site was at the junction of the West Branch of the Penobscot River and Millinocket Stream, where it stands today. Things moved quickly, and on May 15, 1899, construction began on the new Great Northern Paper Company paper mill. As the location was not near existing towns, it became necessary to build one. Millinocket, meaning "the land of many islands" after all the islands in the Penobscot River, was incorporated on March 16, 1901.

Garret Schenck contracted bonded labor, especially stonemasons from Italy.  The term "bonded" in this case referred to the fact that the Italians owed for the passage to America and were in debt the minute they set foot in this country. Italian masons were largely responsible for the construction of the Millinocket mill.

Throughout the 20th century, the community prospered. It developed a reputation as a small but successful rural town, mostly due to the paper industry, but also to its proximity to Katahdin, Maine's tallest mountain, and Moosehead Lake, Maine's largest lake.

In early 2003, however, Great Northern Paper announced it had filed for bankruptcy protection for its Millinocket and East Millinocket mills. Since then, the mill town has struggled to reshape its economy, while receiving significant help from the state government and local economic development efforts. Shortly after closing the mills, a Canadian corporation purchased the bankrupt paper mills in both Millinocket and East Millinocket. In addition to the traditional forest products industry, Millinocket has been growing a service economy, and has grown into a major four-season tourist attraction. The region is served by the Millinocket Municipal Airport, which sells both 100LL avgas and jet fuel.

Geography

The town is crossed by State Route 11 and State Route 157. Millinocket is the closest town to Mount Katahdin, located in Baxter State Park  to the northwest. At an elevation , its summit is the highest point in Maine and the northern terminus of the Appalachian Trail.

Millinocket Stream flows through the town, from Millinocket Lake north of the town into the West Branch Penobscot River.

Climate
This climatic region is typified by large seasonal temperature differences, with warm to hot (and often humid) summers and cold (sometimes severely cold) winters.  According to the Köppen Climate Classification system, Millinocket has a humid continental climate, abbreviated "Dfb" on climate maps.

Demographics

2010 census
As of the census of 2010, there were 4,506 people, 2,167 households, and 1,305 families living in the town. The racial makeup of the town was 97.7% White, 0.2% African American, 0.7% Native American, 0.4% Asian, 0.1% Pacific Islander, 0.1% from other races, and 0.8% from two or more races. Hispanic or Latino of any race were 0.5% of the population.

There were 2,167 households, of which 19.3% had children under the age of 18 living with them, 48.4% were married couples living together, 8.7% had a female householder with no husband present, 3.1% had a male householder with no wife present, and 39.8% were non-families. 34.2% of all households were made up of individuals, and 17.1% had someone living alone who was 65 years of age or older. The average household size was 2.06 and the average family size was 2.58.

The median age in the town was 51.5 years. 15.5% of residents were under the age of 18; 5.5% were between the ages of 18 and 24; 17.8% were from 25 to 44; 36.6% were from 45 to 64; and 24.6% were 65 years of age or older. The gender makeup of the town was 48.6% male and 51.4% female.

2000 census
As of the census of 2000, there were 5,203 people, 2,295 households, and 1,556 families living in the town. The racial makeup of the town was 98.52% White, 0.10% Black or African American, 0.54% Native American, 0.37% Asian, 0.02% from other races, and 0.46% from two or more races. Hispanic or Latino of any race were 0.23% of the population.

There were 2,295 households, out of which 25.7% had children under the age of 18 living with them, 55.7% were married couples living together, 9.1% had a female householder with no husband present, and 32.2% were non-families. 28.3% of all households were made up of individuals, and 14.5% had someone living alone who was 65 years of age or older.  The average household size was 2.25 and the average family size was 2.69.

In the town, the population was spread out, with 21.1% under the age of 18, 4.9% from 18 to 24, 25.0% from 25 to 44, 29.7% from 45 to 64, and 19.4% who were 65 years of age or older.  The median age was 44 years. For every 100 females, there were 93.9 males.  For every 100 females age 18 and over, there were 90.5 males.

The median income for a household in the town was $29,318, and the median income for a family was $40,893. Males had a median income of $41,218 versus $23,289 for females. The per capita income for the town was $17,130.  About 11.8% of families and 14.8% of the population were below the poverty line, including 20.4% of those under age 18 and 12.4% of those age 65 or over.

Arts and culture
Sites of interest include the Antique Snowmobile Museum, the Millinocket Historical Society and Museum, and the West Branch of the Penobscot River.

Education
Schools in Millinocket are under the jurisdiction of the Millinocket School Department. The town's primary school is the Granite Street School, the middle school is Millinocket Middle School, and the secondary school is Stearns High School.

Media

Newspaper 
Millinocket has one traditional newspaper and one online newspaper which serve the area:

 Katahdin/Lincoln area News, a weekly newspaper, distributed each Thursday, which offers a Millinocket section.
 Magic City Morning Star, which has published online since 2002.

Radio 
The area is served by several radio stations, mainly Millinocket-licensed WSYY-FM The Mountain 94.9 (broadcasting for approximately 18¼ hours per day, 7 days a week (from 4:55am through 11:10pm ET), under the slogan, "Radio With An Attitude") and WSYY 1240 offers CBS Sports Radio as "CBS Sports Radio for the Katahdin Area" from Dawn until Dusk (ET), broadcasting only on Weekends (but not between Monday-through-Friday). As an Adult Hits/Full-Service radio station, WSYY-FM airs a format consisting of a mix of oldies/classic hits, adult contemporary, rock music, and some country crossovers, airing the format for approximately 16 hours per day, from 6:00am through 10:00pm ET (reserving the first and, also, the final hour of their broadcast day to When Radio Was). Stations from Bangor and the more powerful stations from Presque Isle are also heard.

Television 
Millinocket was home to the Discovery Channel TV show American Loggers which showcased the logging efforts of Gerald Pelletier Incorporated. Cable television is provided by Bee Line Cable, which provides most of the network affiliates from Bangor.

Notable people 

 Herbert E. Clark, state legislator
 Harry A. Corey, entrepreneur, Canadian politician
 Joseph John Gerry OSB, Bishop of Portland until 2004
 Mary Kathryn Gonya, Miss Maine (1966)
 Jane Harragan, Miss Maine (1950)
 Mike Michaud, former member of the United States House of Representatives
 Andrew St. John, actor
 Joe Whalen, tennis player

References

External links

 Official  Town of Millinocket website
 In Maine, a town on the brink of extinction plots a comeback

 
Company towns in Maine
Towns in Penobscot County, Maine
North Maine Woods
Penobscot River
Populated places established in 1901
1901 establishments in Maine
Towns in Maine